Arthur Harvey (1895–1976), was an American writer, businessman, oil pioneer, major, and a World War I and II veteran

Arthur Harvey may also refer to:

Arthur E. Harvey (1884–1971), American architect
Arthur George Harvey (1866–1927), New Zealand doctor
Arthur Harvey (Australian politician) (1827–1902), politician in the colony of South Australia
Arthur Vere Harvey, Baron Harvey of Prestbury (1906–1994), Royal Air Force officer and British Conservative politician